Jean Claude Drouot (born 17 December 1938) is a Belgian actor whose career has lasted over a half-century. At the age of twenty-five, he gained widespread fame in the French-speaking world as a result of portraying the title role in the popular television adventure series, Thierry la Fronde.

Biography
Born in the Belgian municipality of Lessines, Jean Claude Drouot learned his stagecraft with the Young Theater of the Université Libre de Bruxelles (ULB). Later (date unknown) he moved from Brussels to Paris.  In Paris he followed courses with Charles Dullin.  Until his departure from Dullin's troupe in 1962, he interpreted the great tragedies and plays of Molière. From 1963 until 1966 he starred as Thierry La Fronde for the TV series Thierry La Fronde.  He made his first film in 1965 with The Devil's Tricks of Paul Vecchiali.  This was followed by Happiness. He then played in British and American films such as: Laughter in the Dark (1969), Mr. Freedom (1969), and Nicholas and Alexandra (1971). In 1984, he became director of the National Dramatic Center of Reims and, from 1985 to 1989, he was director of the National Theatre of Belgium. In 1999, he joined the Comédie-Française.

He is married to Claire and has two children, Olivier and Sandrine. His family made their only film appearance in the 1965 Agnès Varda film, Le Bonheur.

Filmography
Thierry La Fronde  (1963–1966) as Thierry La Fronde
The Devil's Tricks  (1965) as Daniel
Le Bonheur  (1965) as François
Laughter in the Dark  (1969) as Herve Tourace
Mr. Freedom  (1969) as Dick Sensass
A Midsummer Night's Dream as Oberon
The Breach (1970) as Charles Regnier
The Light at the Edge of the World  (1971) as Virgilio
Nicholas and Alexandra  (1971) as Mr. Gilliard
Les Gens de Mogador  (1972) as Rodolphe Vernet
L'histoire très bonne et très joyeuse de Colinot trousse-chemise (1973) as Masnil Plassac
Gaston Phébus  (1978) as Gaston Phébus
The Year of the French  (1982) as General Humbert
Les Rois maudits (2005) as Enguerrand de Marigny
The Conquerors (2013) as Joseph Tadoussac
Capitaine Marleau (2017, 2020) as Léopold Salaun (2 Episodes, 1 Episode)

References

External links

1938 births
Living people
Troupe of the Comédie-Française